Deblando is a town in Saint Andrew Parish, Grenada.  It is located at along the island's eastern coast.

References

Populated places in Grenada